Miramare Castle is a 19th-century castle on the Gulf of Trieste near Trieste in northeastern Italy.

Miramare may also refer to:

Places
, a neighborhood in the district of Barcola, Trieste, Italy where Miramare Castle is located
 Miramare railway station
, a district in Rimini, Italy
Miramare Airport, now Federico Fellini International Airport in Rimini, Italy
Royal Miramare Theatre, a theatre formerly located at Independence Square (now Martyrs' Square) in Tripoli, Libya
Stadio Miramare, a multi-use stadium in Manfredonia, Italy

Other
"Miramare", Op. 247, an overture by Julius Fučík

See also
Miramar (disambiguation)